A confessional community is a group of people with similar religious beliefs.

In the Ottoman Empire, this allowed people to be grouped by religious confession as opposed to nationality or ethnicity, which was more consistent with the existing social structure. People were able to represent themselves more effectively as a group than as individuals. With the rise of nationalism under the Ottoman Empire and after the Ottoman Tanzimat (1839–76) reforms, the term Millet was used for legally protected ethno-religious minority groups, similar to the way other countries used the word nation.

The Lebanese Constitution is based on the idea of Confessionalism, a balance of powers between a number of state-recognized confessional communities.

See also
Millet (Ottoman Empire)
Vakif

References

Demographics of the Ottoman Empire
Politics of the Ottoman Empire
Religion in the Ottoman Empire
Society of the Ottoman Empire
Confessionalism